Cyril Fradan (1928–1997) was a South African artist and designer who worked almost exclusively in acrylic paints incorporating various glazing techniques.

Life and work 

One of South Africa's foremost painters, Cyril Fradan was born in Johannesburg in 1928. He was educated, and later lectured at the University of the Witwatersrand and held his first one-man show in Johannesburg in 1954. Relocating to London in 1960, Fradan exhibited successfully in most British and European art centres.

Fradan worked almost exclusively in acrylic paints and made extensive use of glazing techniques. Furthermore, he was a successful and skilled exponent of the Baroque style used in contemporary, non-figurative terms. What this means is that Fradan blends illusion, light and colour, and a sense of passionate movement, all calculated to overwhelm the viewer by a direct emotional appeal. His use of such effects as the dissolved contour, the rendering of movement through flickering light, allied with his use of glowing colour, brought into being a style that had a profound effect on the South African audiences who saw it.

Fradan rarely titled his paintings, believing that the images evoked in the spectator by the swirling, energetic forms in his canvases were, in fact, the correct ones.

"Each viewer will see in my paintings what he wants to - I don't believe that the artist should interpose with titles, which are often misleading anyway."

As well as painting, Fradan provided costume designs for dramatic productions including the 1955 Margaret Inglis production of Shakespeare's Hamlet. Additionally, he provided costume designs for the 1966 Gordon Crosse production of W. B. Yeats's Purgatory.

Fradan was a much-loved and well-respected member of the London arts scene. His annual summer music festivals held at his house at 23 Lower Addison Gardens, were a joy to music lovers and provided an opportunity to view his work. In his later years Fradan eschewed the art gallery scene, preferring his festival-based approach to sales of his increasingly popular paintings. He developed personal relationships with many of his patrons, who met regularly at his home; particularly during the festivals.

Cyril Fradan left for Thailand in 1986, where he died in 1997 after successive operations to remove brain tumours.

Exhibitions 

Cyril Fradan exhibited extensively - including at the Royal Academy, London in 1963. His work is represented in the following public collections:

South African National Gallery, Cape Town
Oliewenhuis Art Museum, Bloemfontein
Nelson Mandela Metropolitan Art Museum (King George VI Art Gallery), Port Elizabeth
Pretoria Art Museum, Pretoria
Pietersburg Art Museum, Polokwane
UNISA, Pretoria

Solo exhibitions

 1961: Woodstock Gallery, London
 1962: Galerie d'Eendt, Amsterdam; Galerie Kobenhaven, Copenhagen; Mercury Gallery, London; Tib Lane Gallery, Manchester
 1964: Mercury Gallery, London
 1968: Galerie Werkstatt, im Schnoor, Bremen, Germany
 1965: Tib Lane Gallery, Manchester; Galerie Sothmann, Amsterdam; Ash Barn Gallery, Petersfield
 1966: Mercury Gallery, London; Tib Lane Gallery, Manchester
 1967: Plymouth Art Centre, Plymouth
 1968: Gallery 101, Johannesburg; Wolpe Gallery, Cape Town; Galerie Sothmann, Amsterdam; Galerie Werkstatt, Bremen
 1969: Tib Lane Gallery, Manchester; York Festival, York; Galerie du Theatre, Geneva
 1970: Lidchi Gallery Gallery, Johannesburg; Kapian Gallery, Cape Town
 1971: Galerie Balans, Amsterdam
 1973: Arts Council Gallery, Belfast; Midland Group Gallery, Nottingham
 1974: Ansdell Gallery, London
 1975: Galerie du Theatre, Geneva
 1976: Goodman Gallery, Johannesburg; Goodman-Wolman Gallery, Cape Town; Pretoria Art Museum, Pretoria
 1977: S.A. Association of Arts, Pretoria; Neil Sack Gallery, Durban
 1979: and thereafter annual exhibitions and music recitals at his Studio in Holland Park, London
 1983: Gallery 21, Johannesburg

Notes

References 
Hobbs, P., Rankin, E. Printmaking: In a Transforming South Africa (Published by New Africa Books, 1997)
Spalding, F., Collins, J. 20th Century Painters and Sculptors (Published by Antique Collectors' Club, 1991)
Contemporary review (Published by New York., 1981)
Art and Artists (Published by Hansom Books, 1973)
Artbibliographies Modern (Published by Clio Press, 1975)
British Humanities Index (Published by Library Association, 1982)
Shakespeare Quarterly (Published by Folger Shakespeare Library, 1955)
The Musical Times (Published by Musical Times Publications Ltd., 1966)
Studio International (Published by Studio Trust, 1969)
Common Sense (Published by Society of Jews and Christians, 1950)
Contemporary review: Incorporating The Fortnightly (Published by Contemporary Review Co., 1979)
The Painter & Sculptor: A Journal of the Visual Arts
Art Index: A Cumulative Author and Subject Index to a Selected List of Fine Arts Periodicals and Museum Bulletins (Published by H. W. Wilson, 1982)
ARTLOOK Johannesburg (January, 1968) p. 11

External links 
http://www.pelmama.org/FRADAN.htm

White South African people
South African expatriates in the United Kingdom
South African painters
South African male painters
1928 births
1997 deaths